In the 2015 dengue outbreak in Taiwan, a significant rise in the number of dengue fever cases was reported in Tainan City, Kaohsiung City, and Pingtung City. As of the end of 2015, official data showed that more than 40,000 people, mostly in these three cities, were infected in 2015. This epidemic began in the summer of 2015, with the first reported occurrence in the North District, Tainan. There were several documented cases in other cities and counties but none resulted in death or were of such large scale.

Statistics 
The Centers for Disease Control lists several statistics about the outbreak. These statistics are reportedly from the Central Epidemic Command Center (CECC) for the Dengue Outbreak. The number of infections in Taiwan during 2015 was some three times the number in 2014.

Cases and deaths by city

Deceased 
The CDC of Taiwan's most recent press release, dated 23 December 2015, gives demographics and statistics about the deceased:"Among the 209 deaths found to be associated with dengue infection, 106 are men and 98 are women. The median age is 75 years old. Each of them, on average, had three chronic conditions such as high blood pressure, diabetes, coronary artery diseases and renal failures. The average number of days between onset and death is 6.2."

Care and Recovery 
The same press release as above states:"Currently, 44 dengue patients are being treated in the intensive care unit. 98.1% of the total reported cases have recovered."

References

External links
Tainan City Government Dengue Epidemic Bulletin
Department of Health of Tainan's Dengue Epidemic Bulletin

2015 disease outbreaks
2015 in Taiwan
Disasters in Taiwan
Southern Taiwan
Disease outbreaks in Taiwan
2015 disasters in Taiwan
Health disasters in Taiwan